Le Praticien en Anesthésie Réanimation (translated title: The Anaesthesia and Intensive Care Practitioner) is a French peer-reviewed medical journal covering anaesthesiology. It was established in 1997 and is published by Elsevier Masson. The editors-in-chief are Francis Bonnet and Muriel Fartoukh. The journal is abstracted and indexed in Embase/Excerpta Medica.

External links 
 

Publications established in 1997
Anesthesiology and palliative medicine journals
Elsevier academic journals
French-language journals
Bimonthly journals